Cosmetic Spoon: Young Girl Swimming is a late Eighteenth Dynasty ancient Egyptian carving by an unknown artist. Completed sometime between 1400 BC–1300 BC, it currently resides in the Louvre, Paris. These spoons are also referred to as "toilet spoons".

It is believed that cosmetic spoons were used to throw myrrh onto fires as offerings to gods or to the dead.

The spoon is made from partially painted carob wood, carved in a "sculpture in the round" fashion.

References

External links
Official Louvre Website with Cosmetic Spoon Young Girl Swimming

14th-century BC works
Egyptian antiquities of the Louvre
Sculptures of ancient Egypt